Memorial Museum of Nadežda and Rastko Petrović is a memorial museum located in Belgrade, the capital of Serbia. It was declared a cultural monument in 1974 by the decision of the Institute for the Protection of Cultural Monuments from 1974.

Memorial Museum is located in a family house of the Belgrade artist Ljubica Luković, sister of Nadežda and Rastko Petrović. The house was built in the period from 1928 to 1935 as a typical house of the Professors' colony. Fixed assets consist of the house and the land around the house.

The exhibition of the museum today consists of the rich legacy of the Petrović family, related to the life and work of Mito Petrović (1852–1911), writer and scholar, painter Nadežda Petrović (1873–1915) and writer Rastko Petrović (1898–1949), which was collected and donated to the National Museum in Belgrade by Ljubica Luković. The museum contains a collection of paintings and sketches of Nadežda Petrović, private correspondence of family members, a collection of works of art and objects that belonged to Rastko Petrović, travel films, records and other items that enable a comprehensive understanding of life and creativity of these important figures, without which the recent cultural history of Serbia is unthinkable.

See more 
 National Museum in Belgrade
 Nadežda Petrović
 Rastko Petrović

References

External links 
 Museums in Belgrade
 Republic Institute for the Protection of Cultural Monuments – Belgrade
 List of monuments

Museums in Belgrade
Palilula, Belgrade